Guido Silvestri (born 9 December 1952 in Carpi), known by his pen name Silver, is an Italian comic book artist. Silver began his comics career as an apprentice of Franco Bonvicini (Bonvi). Silver created the series Lupo Alberto, which began in 1974.

References

Living people
Italian cartoonists
Italian comics artists
1952 births
Artists from Modena